Zalman Baruch Melamed (born 1937) is an Israeli Orthodox rabbi and the rosh yeshiva of the Beit El yeshiva in Beit El. He founded the Arutz Sheva radio station, and served as neighborhood rabbi in Beit El until 2013.

Background
Zalman Baruch Melamed was born in Tel Aviv in 1937. He studied at Kfar Haroeh yeshiva high school, and was among the founders of Yeshivat Kerem B'Yavneh. After a year, in 1954, he transferred to study at Mercaz Harav yeshiva. There, he became very close to the Rosh Yeshiva, Rabbi Zvi Yehuda Kook.

He studied at Mercaz HaRav yeshiva for about a decade, teaching there as well. In 1978, he founded the Beit El yeshiva.

In 1988, Rabbi Melamed founded the Arutz Sheva radio station "to combat the 'negative thinking' and 'post-Zionist' attitudes so prevalent in Israel's liberal-left media". His wife Shulamit manages its day-to-day operations.

He and his wife Shulamit have seven children. One is Rabbi Eliezer Melamed, the rabbi and rosh yeshiva of Har Bracha. Another is Rabbi Yehuda Melamed, who teaches in Yeshivat Hesder Ramat Gan.

Opinions

Visiting the Temple Mount
On halachic grounds, Rabbi Melamed opposes the idea of both Jews and gentiles visiting the Temple Mount.

Views on Israeli citizenship

Rabbi Melamed has stated that, "There must be legislation allowing Jewish people everywhere in the world to become Israeli citizens, even if they do not live here." Melamed viewed this as a way to shore up Israel's Jewish demographic in elections. At the same time, he advocated that certain Arab citizens of Israel should be stripped of their citizenship: "Even those with a democratic viewpoint understand that we must limit the rights of those who wish to harm the State. There are many non-Jews in Israel who are striving to undermine the country." According to Melamed, "These people should not be able to vote who sits in the Knesset or determine who leads the country. The law must dictate that the subversive cannot be citizens."

Notes

External links

 Shiurim by Rabbi Zalman Baruch Melamed at Yeshiva.org.il

Religious Zionist rosh yeshivas
Israeli Orthodox Jews
Israeli Orthodox rabbis
Mercaz HaRav alumni
Living people
Chardal
1937 births